Intoxicated is a single by American rock band Hinder from their album When the Smoke Clears. It was released on May 3, 2015 on The End Records. The song debuted on the Active Rock chart at No. 38.

Charts

References

2015 songs
Hinder songs
Songs written by Marshal Dutton
Songs written by Cody Hanson